Holiday of My Lifetime is a documentary series is hosted by Len Goodman. It began on 20 October 2014, and concluded on 4 March 2016.

Format
Goodman and a celebrity guest travel to a favourite childhood holiday location of that guest within the United Kingdom. Goodman meets with local historians and residents to get an insight into how the places have changed over the decades.

Episodes

Series 1 (2014)

Christmas Special (2014)

Series 2 (2016)

References

External links
 
 

2010s British documentary television series
2014 British television series debuts
2016 British television series endings
BBC Scotland television shows
BBC television documentaries
English-language television shows